The 2008 FIVB Women's World Olympic Qualification Tournament is a qualification tournament to determine the final four spots for the 2008 Summer Olympics. The qualifying tournament, The round-robin tournament through May 17–25 doubles up as the Asian Olympic Qualification Tournament and so the best three teams plus the best Asian team (even if any of the best three teams are Asian) will book their tickets to Beijing. Hosts Japan will be joined by Thailand, Korea, Kazakhstan (best-ranked teams at the Asian Continental Championship), Serbia, Poland (best world-ranked teams from CEV), Dominican Republic and Puerto Rico (best world-ranked teams from NORCECA).

Teams
 Host: 
 Asia: ,  and 
 Europe: , 
 North America: 
 South America or Africa: *

* The final place for tournament was to be decided by a Playoff between Peru and Kenya, the teams ranked second in the South American and African Qualifiers, but both teams dropped their applications. Uruguay (third in the World Rankings for South America) wasn’t ready to apply, while Egypt (third in the World Rankings among African countries) has not played in any Continental Qualification Tournaments. In these circumstances, the FIVB has chosen Puerto Rico, the best Norceca team in the World Rankings after Dominican Republic.

Squads

Results

Ranking

 Kazakhstan is counted as The Asian Continental Qualification Tournament Champion since it is the best Asian team outside the top 3.

Individual awards

Best Scorer

Best Spiker
 
Best Blocker
 

Best Server
 
Best Digger
 
Best Setter
 
Best Receiver

References
 FIVB

Volleyball qualification for the 2008 Summer Olympics
Olympic Qualification Women
Volleyball Olympic Qualification
FIVB